Coast II Coast is the second album by hip hop trio The Alkaholiks, released in 1995 via Loud. It features guest rapping from Xzibit, Diamond D, King Tee, Lootpack, Q-Tip, Declaime, and The Baby Bubbas.  Its production is by Tha Alkoholiks, E-Swift, Madlib, and Diamond D.

Critical reception
Jeff Chang, in Trouser Press, praised E-Swift's production, calling it "as incisive as ever."

Track listing 
All tracks written by Rico Smith, James Robinson and Eric Brooks, and produced by E-Swift, except where noted.

Notes
  signifies a co-producer
  signifies an additional producer

Album singles

Album chart positions

Singles chart positions

References

1995 albums
Tha Alkaholiks albums
Albums produced by Madlib
Albums produced by Diamond D
Loud Records albums
RCA Records albums